This is a list of properties and districts in Long County, Georgia that are listed on the National Register of Historic Places (NRHP).

Current listings

|}

References

Long
Buildings and structures in Long County, Georgia